Moyna Flannigan (born 1963) is a Scottish artist working primarily in drawing, collage and painting.

Flannigan is best known for her imagined paintings of women in psychologically charged situations. "The real subject of my paintings is space, both physical and psychological. [...] Space in a painting is not simply an environment for action; it’s a place with formal relationships that have inherent hidden meaning."

Education and teaching 
Flannigan was born in Kirkcaldy in 1963. She obtained a Bachelor of Arts from Edinburgh College of Art in 1985 and a Master of Fine Art from Yale University School of Art, New Haven, Connecticut in 1987. Formerly a lecturer in painting at Glasgow School of Art (1995 - 2005), Flannigan was a teaching fellow at Edinburgh College of Art, University of Edinburgh (2015-2019).

Influences 
The Glasgow Herald in 2014, at the time of her Generations show, Flannigan discussed drawing inspiration from the work of surrealist sculptor Alberto Giacometti. His work Femme égorgée (Woman With Her Throat Cut) "fed its way into her subconscious". She has also drawn inspiration from the 1979 art film, Stalker, directed by Andrei Tarkovsky, and from Masaccio's masterly 15th-century fresco, Expulsion From The Garden Of Eden in the Brancacci Chapel, Florence, which she visited as part of her residency in Rome.

While Giacometti's 1932 bronze, is "a worrying human-insect hybrid, a splayed, disembowelled figure part praying mantis, part crime victim, Flannigan turns up the volume of Giacometti's angst-ridden attitude to the female form; her own painted figures echo his sculpture's splayed structure, but are defiantly, terrifyingly alive with their blood red lips and stiletto heels".

Exhibitions

Solo exhibitions 
 Girl With Tear, A-M-G5, Glasgow, 2019
 Tear, NOW, Scottish National Gallery of Modern Art Edinburgh, 2018–19 
 earth sky body, Gimpel Fils, London, 2015
 white heart beating, Galerie Akinci, Amsterdam, 2015
 Stare, part of GENERATION: 25 Years of Contemporary Art in Scotland, Gallery of Modern Art, Glasgow, 2014
 The Body Stretches to the Edge, Galerie Akinci, Amsterdam, 2013
 New Work by Moyna Flannigan – What you see is where you’re at, Part 3, Scottish National Gallery of Modern Art Edinburgh
 Trouble Loves Me, Sara Meltzer Gallery, New York, 2009
 Sphinx, Sara Meltzer Gallery, New York, 2008
 Moyna Flannigan: A footprint in the hall, Mount Stuart Visual Arts Programme, Mount Stuart, Isle of Bute, Scotland
 Well, well, doggerfisher, Edinburgh, 2006
 Poke, Galerie Akinci, Amsterdam, 2006
 A Pie in the Kisser, Sara Meltzer Gallery, New York, 2005
 Once upon our time: Portrait Miniatures by Moyna Flannigan, Scottish National Portrait Gallery, Edinburgh, 2004
 Knucklehead, Sara Meltzer Gallery, New York, 2003
 I'm a stranger here myself, doggerfisher, Edinburgh, Scotland, 2002
 I think about it almost all the time, Sara Meltzer Gallery, New York, 2002
 I could be happy with you, Gallery Akinci, Amsterdam, 2001
 Gallery Albrecht, Munich, Germany, 2000
 Lotta Hammer Gallery, London, 1998
 The British School at Rome, 1997
 CCA, Centre for Contemporary Art, Glasgow, 1996

Selected group exhibitions 
 Cute Carnival curated by Rachel Maclean, Birmingham City Art Gallery, 2019
 Mirrors: when we hunt reality and hang its skin upon our walls, A-M-G5, Glasgow, 2019
 Where the f*ck is my sock, Galerie Akinci, Amsterdam 2017
 The Female Gaze, Pallant House Gallery, Chicester, 2017
 Face 2 Face, Torre Abbey Museum, Torquay, 2017
 Paper Trail: Drawings|Watercolours|Prints, City Art Centre, Edinburgh, 2017
 INK: Public Archive - Five Decades of Printmaking at The Glasgow Print Studio, Glasgow, UK, 2017
 That Which Remains, Mount Stuart, Isle of Bute, Scotland, 2016
 now now, Andrew Cranston, Moyna Flannigan, Graeme Todd, West Barns Arts, Dunbar, Scotland, 2016
 Drawing on Drawing, Andrew Grant Gallery, Edinburgh College of Art, University of Edinburgh, 2016
 Face to Face: British Portrait Prints from the Clifford Chance Collection, Sir John Soane's Museum, London, 2014
 The Miniature Museum, Gemeentemmuseum Den Haag, Netherlands, 2013
 Collectors' Choice, Royal Scottish Academy, Edinburgh, 2013
 Dressed To Kill, City Art Centre, Edinburgh, 2013
 Teasers, Selected Works from the Pizzuti Collection by Women Artists, Pizzuti Collection, Columbus, Ohio, USA, 2012
 Pincushion, a Polarcap Exhibition, John Gray Centre, Haddington, Scotland, 2012 
 Twisted Sister, Dodge Gallery, New York, 2012
 A Parliament of Lines, City Art Centre, Edinburgh, Scotland, 2012
 To Have a Voice, Mackintosh Gallery, Glasgow School of Art, Scotland, 2012
 VANHUIT HIER – OUT OF HERE: The Collectors Show, Van Abbe Museum, Eindhoven, Netherlands 2011
 Melting Point, Galerie Akinci, Amsterdam, 2011
 Playboy Redux: Contemporary Artists Interpret the Iconic Playboy Bunny, The Andy Warhol Museum, Pittsburgh, USA, 2010
 Moyna Flannigan/Julie Roberts, Galerie Akinci, Amsterdam, Netherlands, 2009 
 What you see is where you're at: Part 1, Scottish National Gallery of Modern Art, Edinburgh, 2009
 Strike A Pose, Stephen Friedman Gallery, London, 2009 
 Moyna Flannigan, Isabel Nolan, Hanneline Visnes, doggerfisher, Edinburgh, UK, 2009 
 The Fool, Northern Gallery of Contemporary Art, Sunderland, UK, 2009 
 Summer Exhibition 2009, (Invited Artist), Royal Academy of Arts, London, 2009
 Maternity: Images of Motherhood, Scottish National Gallery of Modern Art, Edinburgh, 2008 
 Out of Shape: Stylistic Distortions of the Human Form in Art from the Logan Collection, The Frances Lehman Loeb Art Center, Vassar College, USA, 2008 
 Welcome Home, Sara Meltzer Gallery, New York, 2006 
 Moyna Flannigan, Gerben Mulder, Albrecht Schnider, Andrei Roiter, Galerie Akinci, Amsterdam, 2004 
 The Birthday Party, Collective Gallery, Edinburgh, 2004 
 The Drawing Project, Vamiali's Gallery, Athens, 2004 
 Solar Lunar, doggerfisher, Edinburgh, 2004 
 Rendered, Sara Meltzer Gallery, New York, 2003 
 The Company We Keep, Inman Gallery, Houston, Texas, 2003
 Moyna Flannigan, Gerben Mulder, Elke Krystufek, Ronald Versloot, Galerie Akinci, Amsterdam, 2003 
 Love Over Gold: Works from the Collection of the Scottish National Gallery of Modern Art, Gallery of Modern Art, Glasgow, 2003 
 New, Green On Red Gallery, Dublin, Ireland, 2002
 New: Recent Acquisitions of Contemporary British Art, Scottish National Gallery of Modern Art, Edinburgh, 2002 
 Beuys to Hirst: Art Works at the Deutsche Bank, Dean Gallery, Edinburgh, 2001 
 Here and Now: Scottish Art 1990-2001, DCA, Dundee, Scotland, 2001 
 Open Country: Contemporary Scottish Artists, Musáe cantonal des Beaux-Arts de Lausanne, Switzerland, 2001
 Annäherung an das Portrait: Moyna Flannigan, Konrad Klapheck & Monica Castillo, Galerie Albrecht, Munich, 2000 
 Moyna Flannigan & Chantal Joffe'', Galerie Akinci, Amsterdam, 2000

Selected publications and reviews 
2007 Crichton Stuart, Anthony. Moyna Flannigan: An Intervention at Mount Stuart, Mount Stuart Visual Arts Programme, Isle of Bute [catalogue]

2006 Dannatt, Adrian. Moyna Flannigan Paintings 1998-2006. Edinburgh. Doggerfisher [catalogue]

2006 Clark, Robert. "Moyna Flannigan, Edinburgh." The Guardian, August 19: 36

2005 Monaghan, Helen. "New York, Moyna Flannigan, Sara Meltzer Gallery 7 Apr - 14 May, MAP, Issue 2/Summer 2005

2004 Lapham, Lewis. "Moyna Flannigan", Harper's Magazine, November, p. 23

2004 Boyce, Martin. "Moyna Flannigan" Scotland on Sunday, Critics' Choice, May 9

2004 Hartley, Keith. "Once upon our time: Portrait Miniatures by Moyna Flannigan", The National Galleries of Scotland, Edinburgh [catalogue]

2003 Herbert, Martin. "Moyna Flannigan", Frieze Art Fair Yearbook 2003, London [catalogue]

2003 Chambers, Christopher. "Moyna Flannigan," FlashArt, July–September, p. 67

2002 Mulholland, Neil. "Moyna Flannigan," FlashArt, November–December

2001Tufnell, Rob and Katrina M. Brown, Here and Now: Scottish Art 1990-2001, DCA, Dundee [catalogue]

2001 Nicod, Caroline, et al. Open Country - Scotland: Contemporary Scottish Artists, Musee cantonal des Beaux-Arts de Lausanne, Switzerland [catalogue]

2001 Hartley, Keith. Locale, City Art Centre, Edinburgh [catalogue]

1999 Marlow, Tim. The NatWest Art Prize 1999, Lothbury Gallery, London [catalogue]

1997 Mania, Patrizia. Fine Art Scholars 1997, British Art School at Rome [catalogue]

1996 Kingston, Angela. Moyna Flannigan, Centre for Contemporary Art, Glasgow [catalogue]

References 

1963 births
Alumni of the Edinburgh College of Art
Yale School of Art alumni
Academics of the Glasgow School of Art
Scottish women artists
Scottish women academics
Academics of the University of Edinburgh
Living people